Koji Seki or Kōji Seki may refer to:

Koji Seki (born 1972), former Japanese football player
Kōji Seki (born 1911), Japanese film director

See also
Koji (disambiguation)